McAllister v. United States, 141 U.S. 174 (1891), was a decision of the United States Supreme Court concerning the removal power under the Appointments Clause.

References

External links 
 

1891 in United States case law
United States Supreme Court cases
United States Supreme Court cases of the Fuller Court
Appointments Clause case law
United States separation of powers case law